Paolo Cesaretti (born 1957 in Milan) is an Italian historian, lecturer from the University of Bergamo. He is professor of Byzantine civilization and Roman history.

Biography 
He is the author of works on Byzantine hagiography (6th-11th centuries), the Byzantine philological tradition (6th-12th centuries), Late Antiquity and the 6th century, as well as the relations between Byzantium and the West.

He is also the author of monographs, critical editions, articles published in international newspapers, as well as translations such as the Secret History of Procopius of Caesarea in Italian in 1996.

In 2002, he is rewarded with the Grinzane Cavour Prize in the "Best Non-fiction" category for his biography of the empress Theodora.

He teaches Byzantine civilization at the University Gabriele Annunzio de Chieti and at the Fondation Cardinal Giovanni of Milan.

He has also giving seminars on Byzantine hagiography of the 10th century.

Publications 
 Theodora: Empress of Byzantium , Vendome Press, 2004
 Ravenna. Gli splendori di un Impero, 2005
 L'impero perduto. Vita di Anna di Bisanzio, una sovrana tra Oriente e Occidente, 2006
 Le quattro mogli dell'imperatore. Storia di Leone VI di Bisanzio e della sua corte, 2015

References

External links

 Grandi & Associati website
 CESOR website
 Biography at La Finestra Sul Mondo

1957 births
Living people
Italian Byzantinists
20th-century Italian historians
21st-century Italian historians
Scholars of Byzantine history